Welsh Harp railway station was built by the Midland Railway in 1870 on its extension to St. Pancras station.

History
The station opened on 2 May 1870. With a single island platform between the slow lines, it was important for people escaping from the City for a day out, fishing or boating on the Brent Reservoir built in 1838. It was named after the nearby tavern, the Old Welsh Harp, but only lasted 33 years, closing on 1 July 1903. There are now no visible remains of the station as it was quickly demolished after closure. The Old Welsh Harp inn was demolished c. 1971.

Route

References

Railway stations in Great Britain opened in 1870
Disused railway stations in the London Borough of Barnet
Railway stations in Great Britain closed in 1903
Former Midland Railway stations